A kagyin is a form of Burmese martial song performed during a shield dance. Its purpose is to inspire both the singer and their audience with national spirit and patriotism. A kagyin is sung while performing systematic defensive footwork, a sword in the right hand and a ka in the left.

Kagyins were first performed in 1312 during the reign of Thihathu. The form further developed in the Pinya Kingdom under Kyawswa I.

Format
A kagyin does not use four syllables in each line, unlike the classical Burmese verse from which it is derived.

As a yadu is sometimes written between the verses of luta poetry, a thanbauk can be written into a kagyin.

Subject
Most kagyin describe the beauty of the three seasons, seasonal flowers, and the development of the state, as in egyin and angyin.

Notable composers and works
The Myinsaing Shwepyi Kagyin of Kyawswa I is most well-known today. It is assigned to 11th graders studying Burmese literature and poetry.

Notes

References

See also
 Burmese literature

Burmese literature
Poetic forms